The Colleges of Durham University are residential colleges that are the primary source of accommodation and support services for undergraduates and postgraduates at Durham University, as well as providing a focus for social, cultural and sporting life for their members, and offering bursaries and scholarships to students. They also provide funding and/or accommodation for some of the research posts in the University. All students at the University are required to be members of one of the colleges.

Durham University has 17 colleges, of which University College is the oldest, founded in 1832. The newest college is South, founded in 2020. The last single-sex college, St Mary's, became mixed in 2005 with the admittance of male undergraduates. One college, Ustinov, admits only postgraduates.

Colleges

Durham operates a collegiate structure similar to that of the University of Oxford and the University of Cambridge, in that all colleges at Durham, being constituent colleges of a "recognised body", are "listed bodies" in the Education (Listed Bodies) (England) Order 2013 made under the Education Reform Act 1988. The "recognised body" in this case is Durham University. Though most of the Durham colleges are governed and owned directly by the University itself, and so do not enjoy the independence of colleges at Oxford and Cambridge, the status of the Durham colleges is similar to those in Oxford and Cambridge, setting Durham colleges apart from those at the universities of Kent, Lancaster, and York. However, unlike at Oxford and Cambridge (and federal universities such as London and the University of the Highlands and Islands), there is no formal teaching at most Durham colleges (although St John's and St Chad's have their own academic and research staff and offer college-based programmes in conjunction with the University). The colleges dominate the residential, social, sporting, and pastoral functions within the university, and there is heavy student involvement in their operation.

Formal dinners (known as "formals") are held at many colleges; gowns are often worn to these events. There is a great deal of intercollegiate rivalry, particularly in rowing and other sporting activities. There is also rivalry between the older colleges of the Bailey and the newer colleges of the Hill.

Types of College
The University is collegiate in structure. There are four different sorts of college: Maintained Colleges and Societies, Recognised Colleges, Licensed Halls of Residence, and Affiliated Colleges.

Maintained Colleges are governed directly by, and are financially dependent on, the University.  Their principals and staff are appointed by University Council. The maintained colleges are overseen by the Deputy Warden, who is also a member of the University Executive Committee.
Recognised Colleges (St John's and St Chad's) are 'recognised' as colleges of the University, but they are actually incorporated as separate institutions. They are in effect accredited, being governed, financed and managed independently of the University and being educational charities in their own right. However, as a condition of their ongoing recognition by the University, the University's Council must approve the appointment of their principals and be notified of changes to their constitutions.
Licensed Halls of Residences are, unlike Recognised Colleges, not recognised as colleges of the University, and their principals are only ex officio members of Senate if the hall has 25 or more matriculated students in residence. Under statute 14, Council may recognise any college within County Durham as a licensed hall of residence; at the moment only Ushaw College is recognised in this statute, Neville's Cross College (now merged into New College Durham) was a licensed hall from 1924 to 1977. The regulations as to the approval of principals and changes to their constitutions apply to licensed halls in the same way as to recognised colleges.

Affiliated Colleges are treated under statute 39, rather than statutes 14 & 15 like the other colleges. This states that Council may, on the recommendation of Senate, recognised any college as an affiliated college. There are currently no affiliated colleges. Previous affiliated colleges have included Codrington College in Barbados, Fourah Bay College in  Sierra Leone (now part of the University of Sierra Leone), and Sunderland Technical College (now the University of Sunderland). Affiliated colleges are not generally considered part of the collegiate structure of the University.

The University validates degrees at other colleges not recognised under any of the above categories. Current arrangements include the validation of the Church of England's Common Award at a number of theological colleges. The Royal Academy of Dance also used to teach courses leading to degrees validated by Durham.

Hill and Bailey 

Most colleges can be classified into two groups: Bailey colleges, located on Durham's peninsula around Durham Cathedral, and Hill colleges on Elvet Hill on the other side of the river.

The five Bailey colleges are located in historic buildings on The Bailey, the peninsula around the castle and cathedral that forms the historic centre of Durham.  They include most of the older colleges of the university.

The Hill colleges are located in purpose-built buildings on Elvet Hill to the south of the city, close to the Mountjoy site which houses most of the university's departments and central facilities.  The first hill college was St Mary's, which moved in 1952 from the Bailey. All new colleges founded in Durham since then have been on Elvet Hill, and as of 2020 houses it eight colleges, with two more under construction.

Two colleges do not fit into this grouping: the College of St Hild and St Bede, formed in 1975 as a merger of two Victorian teacher training colleges, is located along with the Education Department on Gilesgate, on the opposite side of Durham from Elvet Hill. Ustinov College, the university's only postgraduate-only college, is based at Sheraton Park on the same side of the city as Elvet Hill but further from the city centre, which was formerly the home of Neville's Cross College.

Some colleges also have accommodation in other parts of the city, most notably St Cuthbert's Society, which has its headquarters on the Bailey but its largest accommodation blocks at the end of Old Elvet, across the river from St Hild and St Bede.

Planned Colleges

The university announced in 2017 its intention to build four to six new colleges by 2027.

The first of these, South College, opened in 2020 on the Mount Oswald site, alongside a new home for John Snow College which relocated from Queen's Campus in 2018.

In 2023, it was announced that the university planned to work with the owners of Rushford Court private hall, formerly County Hospital, to equip the site with college facilities, to serve as a temporary home for College of St Hild and St Bede during renovation of its own site, then to become the university's eighteenth college once Hild Bede returned to its own buildings.

College architecture

The colleges built on Elvet Hill each have their own distinctive architecture. The first college built in the area, St Mary's in 1952, was designed by Vincent Harris and has been described as both neo-Georgian and domestic-classical. It set a "colleges-in-a-green-landscape" tone that was followed by the other hill colleges, even while their architectural styles varied widely. The next, Grey College (1959) was designed by T. Worthington of Thomas Worthington and Sons. It was built of brick in a domestic Georgian style, and has been called the most architecturally disappointing of the post-war colleges, looking like "a mature suburban housing estate". After this, the remainder of the post-war colleges were built in a variety of modernist styles. The architect for the concrete St Aidan's College was Sir Basil Spence; the original design called for the brutalist dining hall to be balanced by a chapel, but this was never built.  Van Mildert College by Middleton, Fletcher and Partners follows a "conventional modern idiom" with a formal layout around the lake, serrated blocks and cloistered walks. Collingwood College was designed in a functionalist style in brown brick by Sir Richard Sheppard, and shows similarities to his more famous work at Churchill College, Cambridge, but with less ambition and expense. Another, very different, example of functionalist architecture is found at Trevelyan College, where its hexagonal forms, designed by Stillman and Eastwick-Field, won a Civic Trust Award in 1968.

List of Colleges

Since 2018 when university teaching at the university's campus in Stockton-on-Tees finished, all colleges have been located in Durham City.

The student numbers in the table below are up to date for the 2010/11 year.

U = Undergraduates, P = Postgraduates, F = Female, M = Male

Heads of Houses
The senior member of each college is an officer known generically as the Head of College or Head of House. His or her specific title varies from college to college as indicated in the list below, but there is no particular significance to the variation. The heads of the maintained colleges are also part-time members of an academic department.

Principal: Collingwood College, John Snow College, Josephine Butler College, South College, St Aidan's College, St Chad's College†, St Cuthbert's Society (formerly Censor), College of St Hild and St Bede, St John's College, St Mary's College (formerly Mistress), Stephenson College, Trevelyan College, Ustinov College, University College (formerly Master), Van Mildert College (formerly Master)
Master: Grey College, Hatfield College

†The Principal of St Chad's is also officially known as 'President' (as was the head of Ushaw College). The titular head of that college is known as the 'Rector'. Similarly, the Chair of the St John's College Council is the 'President' of that College.

Former Colleges
A number of colleges have been part of Durham University but have since folded or cancelled their association with the university.

Durham University currently recognises seventeen colleges. However, since its foundation in 1832, a number of other colleges have been part of the university. Two of these have become completely defunct; others have ended their association with the university, or left to become independent institutions of their own.

Bishop Cosin's Hall

Bishop Cosin's Hall on Palace Green was opened as the university's third college in 1851. However, a collapse in student numbers in the late 1850s and 1860s meant the university was unable to sustain three colleges at the time, and it was merged into University College in 1864. At the close of the 19th century it became a common room for St. Cuthbert's Society. The building (which had also been the original home of University College before it moved into the castle) is still owned by the university, and was used by University College until 2006, after which it became the home of the Institute of Advanced Study in January 2007.

Neville's Cross College
Neville's Cross College was opened in 1921. It was primarily a teacher-training college, but from 1924 it was also a licensed hall of the University and admitted students to read for both undergraduate courses and postgraduate degrees.

The college merged with Durham Technical College in 1977 to form New College Durham, whereupon it ceased to be associated with the University. The former site of the college in Sheraton Park became home to the University's Ustinov College in 2017.

Ushaw College
Ushaw College was a Catholic seminary located in Ushaw Moor, a village to the west of Durham. It was opened in 1808 by scholars who had fled from Douai, France, when English College was forced to close during the French Revolution. It affiliated with Durham as 'Licensed Hall' in 1968, though it retained its role primarily as a seminary. It shut as a seminary in 2011 due to a declining number of vocations in the Catholic Church, but remains recognised as a licensed hall in the University's statutes. Part of the college is now used by Durham Business School, and it is also used for conferences and lectures by the Department of Theology and Religion.

Colleges in Newcastle
In 1852, the School of Medicine and Surgery (founded in 1834) in Newcastle upon Tyne was absorbed into the University of Durham as the College of Medicine, allowing students to study for the Licence in Medicine in Durham, after which students could practise Medicine and take the degrees of Bachelor and Doctor in Medicine. At the same time, Neville Hall was opened in Newcastle 'for the reception of Students in Medicine'. The Hall closed at the end of the academic year in 1855/56. In 1871, the College of Medicine was joined by the College of Physical Science, later renamed Armstrong College.

Relations between the two campuses were often strained. They became two autonomous parts of the same university, with the Newcastle colleges merging to become King's College in 1937. In 1947 a proposal to rename the university as the "University of Durham and Newcastle" was approved by all the governing bodies, but was defeated at convocation by 135 votes to 129 in the spring of 1952. This defeat led to King's College eventually leaving the university, to create the new University of Newcastle upon Tyne in 1963.

Presidents of the College of Medicine
 1851-1864  Thomas Emerson Headlam
 1864-1872  Charles Thomas Whitley
 1872-1874  Edward Charlton
 1874-1892  George Yeoman Heath
 1892-1918  George Hare Philipson
 1918-1926  David Drummond
 1926-1934  Thomas Oliver
 1935-1937  Robert Bolam

Principals of the College of Science
 1871-1879  William Steadman Aldis (acting)
 1879-1884  William Steadman Aldis (actual)
 1884-1893  William Garnett
 1893-1894  Vacancy
 1894-1904  Henry Palin Gurney
 1904-1909  Isambard Owen
 1909-1919 William Henry Hadow
 1919-1929 Theodore Morison
 1929-1937 William Sinclair Marris

Rectors of King's College
 1937-1951 Lord Eustace Percy
 1951-1963 Charles Bosanquet (first Vice-Chancellor of Newcastle University)

Sunderland Technical College

Sunderland Technical College was affiliated to Durham from 1930 to 1963 in the Faculty of Applied Science, and was thus associated with the Newcastle division of the University. When the Newcastle division became Newcastle University in 1963, Sunderland's affiliation with Durham ended. In 1969 the Technical College merged with Sunderland Teacher Training College and the Sunderland School of Art to form Sunderland Polytechnic (now the University of Sunderland).

University College Stockton

Originally established in 1992 as the Joint University College On Teesside (JUCOT), a limited company established as a joint venture between Durham and the University of Teesside operating under the name of University College Stockton, this became a teaching and residential college of Durham in 1994 as University College Stockton (UCS), the JUCOT company being wound up. In 1998 the teaching and residential aspects were separated, with teaching becoming the responsibility of the University of Durham, Stockton Campus. In 2001 UCS was replaced by two new colleges, Stephenson and John Snow.

Principals of University College Stockton
  1992 – 1994 Robert Parfitt 
  1994 – 2001 John Hayward

Colleges abroad

Durham University has had two affiliated colleges outside England. Of these, Fourah Bay College is a former part of the university, having ended its affiliation in 1967. It became a constituent college of the University of Sierra Leone on that date. The other affiliate, Codrington College, remained listed as an affiliated college until removed in the revision of the University's statutes approved by the Queen in Council on 13 July 2011.

Renamed and merged Colleges
The College of St Hild and St Bede was formed from the merger of two separate colleges in 1975. The College of the Venerable Bede (usually known as Bede College) had been an all-male college formed in 1838, with St Hild's College formed as an all-female college in 1858. The merged college continued as a recognised college until 1979, when it was taken over by the university and became a maintained college. Prior to this, the two colleges had specialised in the teaching of education; on becoming a maintained college the teaching part of Hild Bede was separated from the college to become the university's School of Education.

The Graduate Society became a full college in 2003 and was subsequently renamed Ustinov College. The Home Students Association (for non-collegiate women) became St Aidan's Society in 1947 and subsequently St Aidan's College in 1961. Hatfield College was originally established as Bishop Hatfield's Hall, taking on its current name in 1919. St Mary's College was founded as the Women's Hostel, becoming a college and taking its current name in 1920.

Stephenson College (originally George Stephenson College) and John Snow College were created in 2001. They replaced the original University College Stockton and
were located on the Queen's Campus at Stockton-on-Tees.

Fictitious Colleges
Jesus College and Coverdale Hall are the settings for the events in Angels and Men, Durham alumna Catherine Fox's first novel (published by Hamish Hamilton in 1996). The location is nowhere stated explicitly, but it is obvious to anyone familiar with the city and the university that it takes place in Durham; Jesus and Coverdale are modelled (very closely) on St John's College and Cranmer Hall.

That Hideous Strength (1943) by C. S. Lewis is set in a fictional university town, whose resemblance to Durham is close enough to require Lewis to insist in the book's preface that it is not so.

See also
 Heraldry of the Colleges in the University of Durham
Colleges of the University of Cambridge
 Colleges of the University of Oxford
 Colleges of the University of York

References

External links
Durham University: Colleges
Some Residential Colleges of the University of Durham
Pasta with a side order of philosophy, please

 
Durham University
Residential colleges